3 Intelligence Company (abbreviated 3 Int Coy) is a line unit reporting directly to the 5th Canadian Division which is headquartered in Halifax, Nova Scotia. The Intelligence Operators & Intelligence Officers of the unit train regularly to augment their Regular Force counterparts on domestic and foreign operations.

Tracing its lineage to the original 3 Intelligence Company (1950) that was dissolved at Unification, the current unit was stood up on November 4, 1995 at a parade near the old library building in Royal Artillery Park, downtown Halifax.

Lineage
The Canadian Army announced the formation of 3 Intelligence Company on February 27, 1950 and the unit was formally stood up on November 15, 1950. The first commanding officer was Major Edward Fairweather Harrington who had formerly served in the Halifax Rifles (23rd Armoured Regiment). Maj Harrington served in the First World War with the Royal Flying Corps, and in the Second World War with the Canadian Intelligence Corps. The first home of the unit was at the Queen Street Armouries.

See also

 Military history of Canada
 History of the Canadian Army
 Canadian Forces
 Intelligence Branch (Canadian Forces)
 2 Intelligence Company
 4 Intelligence Company
 6 Intelligence Company

References

Sources

External links
3 Intelligence Company 
6 Intelligence Company
Canadian Intelligence Corps (C Int C), History & Insignia 

Intelligence units and formations of Canada
Military units and formations established in 1995
Companies of the Canadian Army